The shiny whistling thrush (Myophonus melanurus) is a species of bird in the family Muscicapidae.
It is native to the Barisan Mountains in Sumatra.

Its natural habitat is subtropical or tropical moist montane forests.

References

shiny whistling thrush
Birds of Sumatra
shiny whistling thrush
Taxonomy articles created by Polbot